Events from the 1200s in the Kingdom of Scotland.

Monarch 

 William I, 1165–1214

Events 
1200

 Inchaffray Abbey is erected in Madderty.

1202
 Florence of Holland is elected Bishop of Glasgow.
 William de Malveisin is elected Bishop of St Andrews.
 the Scottish invasion force enters Caithness.
1207

 Holy Trinity Church in Spynie is founded on Moray.

Births

Deaths 
 12 December 1200 – Lochlann of Galloway
 7 July 1202 – Roger de Beaumont, Bishop of St. Andrews
Full date unknown
 c. 1203 – Gille Críst, Earl of Mar
 1204 – Alan fitz Walter, 2nd High Steward of Scotland (born c. 1140)
 1208 – Thomas of Galloway (died c. 1296)

See also 

 List of years in Scotland
 Timeline of Scottish history

References 

1200s